Buddy's Show Boat is a 1933 Warner Bros. Looney Tunes cartoon, directed by Earl Duvall. The short was released on December 9, 1933, and stars Buddy, the second star of the series.

Summary
Buddy's show boat merrily rolls along a river as "Bam Bam Bammy Shore" plays and Captain Buddy whistles in tune; to his brief dismay, one of the ship's whistles blows out of tune, which Our Hero corrects by holding an handkerchief up to the steamwhistle, such that it appears to "blow its nose." A new musical number, "Swanee Smiles," begins, and we see a series of scenes of those aboard the vessel: four blackface minstrels shovel coal into the engine, and, as a gag, descend markedly in height, from the tallest, standing near the engine, to the smallest, to whom the shovel is passed, near the coal pile; two sleepy gentlemen hold on to fishing rods holding aloft sausages, which are slowly pursued by two dogs, which, in the process of locomotion, move the ship's rudder; Cookie peels potatoes; and the same brute from Buddy's Beer Garden spits into the water, only to be spat back at by an annoyed fish. A ferry boat passes, and Buddy's vessel drops anchor at a dock near which a parade heralds the boat's coming. Buddy collects tickets as a band of minstrels sings "Sweet Georgia Brown."

On board the ship, "Mlle. Cookie, Show Boat Star" readies herself for a performance & blows a kiss to a picture of Captain Buddy; in the next room, the bruiser-villain perfumes himself and similarly blows a kiss, but to a picture of Cookie. Buddy picks up the receiver of a ship telephone and rings Cookie's room; she picks up, and they exchange kisses. Having spied the event, the bruiser picks up the phone, blows Cookie a kiss, but receives, instead, a punch in the face. Buddy and Cookie perform a rendition of "Under my Umbrella," after which Buddy introduces, to his pleased crowd, an Aboriginal performer called "Chief Saucer-lip", who, upon the captain's departure, immediately becomes a caricature of Maurice Chevalier, who recites "So I Married the Girl," with a kangaroo at the piano.

Cookie watches from behind the curtain, and the villain easily abducts her with a stage hook; dragging Cookie to the main deck, the bruiser is caught by Buddy and his injunction: "Unhand that woman!" The villain obliges, and punches Buddy that he flies backward into a device that spins him around and sends him flying into the bruiser, who then doubles back into an electrical device with catches his rear end and painfully shocks him. Back in pursuit, the villain is halted by Buddy, who cleverly knocks his adversary backwards, with a wooden life boat, into the cage of "Wally the Trained Walrus," who, now free, bites the rapscallion's behind & chases him into a lower deck. Buddy pulls the villain back up with the ship's wench, & positions him such that the ship's rudder continually bumps his posterior. Buddy and Cookie celebrate together, but part to allow some proper revelry to the true champion, Wally.

Reception
Motion Picture Herald (February 10, 1934): "An amusing animated cartoon in which Buddy docks his showboat at a Mississippi town. He and Cookie entertain the natives until a rough deck hand captures the girl. Buddy goes into animated action, and hangs the villain over the paddle wheel, with diastrous results. Will fit any spot on the bill."

References

External links
 
 
 

1933 films
1933 animated films
1930s American animated films
1930s animated short films
American black-and-white films
Films scored by Bernard B. Brown
Films scored by Norman Spencer (composer)
Films directed by Earl Duvall
Buddy (Looney Tunes) films
Films set on ships
Looney Tunes shorts
Cultural depictions of Maurice Chevalier